Mihail Moxa (after 1550–before 1650) was a Wallachian historiographer and translator. Nothing is known about his family, but Moxa was probably from the Oltenia region, and was a monk at the Bistrița Monastery. He knew Old Church Slavonic well, translating religious texts into Romanian in a colorful and fluent style. He compiled the first extant chronicle in Romanian.

Notes

People from Oltenia
Romanian Orthodox monks
Moldavian and Wallachian chroniclers
Early Modern Romanian writers
Romanian translators
Year of birth uncertain
History of Wallachia